Janice Daniel-Hodge (born 17 April 1962 in England) is a businesswoman, politician and environmental consultant from Saint Kitts and Nevis.

Career 
She graduated from St. Francis College in New York with a degree in biology. In 1987 she also acquired a degree from Alabama A&M University in microbiology. She also has a degree from the University of the Virgin Islands. She was a director and chairperson of The Bank of Nevis Ltd. from 2006 to 2016, and is currently a director at The Bank of Nevis International, Ltd.

In 2020, she became the first female leader of a political party in the country, leading the Nevis Reformation Party (NRP). In 2021, she departed from the Bank of Nevis International.

She led her party into the Saint Kitts and Nevis general election and the Nevis Island Assembly election in 2022.

Family 
She is the daughter of the former Premier of Nevis Simeon Daniel.

References 

1962 births
Living people
21st-century women politicians
Saint Kitts and Nevis women in politics
Nevis Reformation Party politicians
21st-century businesswomen
Leaders of political parties
Alabama A&M University alumni
University of the Virgin Islands alumni
Bankers